Epilog norymberski is a Polish historical film. It was released in 1970.

Cast 

Henryk Borowski as Joachim von Ribbentrop
August Kowalczyk as Alfred Jodl
 Wiktor Nanowski
Leonard Andrzejewski
Jerzy Moes
 Michał Pluciński as Nelte
 Janusz Bylczyński as Accused
Krzysztof Fus
Tadeusz Cygler as General Walther von Brauchistsch
Janusz Cywiński as Defender
Teodor Genera as Defender

References

External links
 

1970 films
Polish historical films
1970s Polish-language films
Films directed by Jerzy Antczak
Nuremberg trials
1970s historical films